Virachilai is a village in the Pudukkottai district in Tamil Nadu, India. It lies 22 km away from Pudukkottai, on the road in between Pudukottai and Ponnamaravathi. The name virachilai is an eponym, etymologically derived from veera chalai or veera saali, a place allegedly named by Lord Rama.

Virachilai is well connected by road, though there is no direct rail connection. There are 3 important bus stops in this village. The nearest railway station is at Namanasamudram which is 13  km away from Virachilai and the railhead is at Pudukkottai. Bus facility is available from Trichy, Pudukkottai, Ponnamaravathi, Thirumayam, and from many other places. The nearest airport connected is at Trichy, 78 km away from virachilai. Accommodation is also available at nearby Pudukkottai.

Virachilai was under Pudukkottai samasthanam since 17th century. The Thondaimans of Pudukkottai came to rule with full sovereignty over the Pudukkottai area from the middle of the 17th century till its amalgamation with the rest of India after Indian Independence in 1947.

In Virachilai main area is arasamarthu street (NADU VEETHI) .

Culture 
Peoples of different communities and religions are living in Virachilai for hundreds of years. Thevar, The Nattukkottai (Nagarathar) chettiar mercantile community lives in this village as well. The thevar, ChettiAR community make every effort to live and adjust to other older communities of Viraichilai. The chettiars of Virachilai have travelled to Malaysia, Singapore and Medan, Sumatra.

Sivan Kovil, Sri Adaikkalam Katha Ambal Kovil, and Sri Subramaniar kovil, Sri Kaliyega meyya Ayyanar Kovil, Sri Koppudai Amman Kovil are the famous temples in virachilai. Also there is a church called Punitha Soosaiyappar thevalayam (St. Joseph Church), and Punitha Anthoniyar thevalayam which was built and maintained by Christians.

Virachilai has rich cultural and historical heritage well preserved in its temple architecture specifically Sivan and Amman temple and St. Joseph church also.

Statuary and adornment in these ancient temples showcases one of the foremost artistic heritages of this village.

Adaikkalam Kaththa Ambal Kovil and Chevvai Festivals 
The main deity of this temple Adaikkalam Kaththa Ambal, is facing in the north, therkku vasal Karuppar in the south.

Vinayagar, Karuppar, Paththu Raja, Mariamman, and Saptha Kannigal are also present in this temple along with Adaikkalam Kaththa Ambal.

Chevvai, (the main festival of this temple) is celebrated in the Tamil month of Vaigasi every year by Virachilai thevar, nattargal, in a grand manner for 22 days.

Chevvai festival has various processes and phases including valanthanai, Mulaippari, Oyilaattam to name a few.

Mulaippari

It's a process of producing Chevvai Kallu, an alcoholic beverage produced by brewing and the fermentation of starches derived from grains by Lactobacillus bulgaricus and Streptococcus thermophilus is prepared for this Chevvai festival in side festival house. These two bacteria are able to grow at 40-45oC, during which they produce lactic acid and various other byproducts that give kallu its unique flavor. After Satharanam, this drink will be diluted and distributed to all by Pandaram.

Oyilattam is a traditional dance of Tamilians widely seen in Tamil Nadu and Sri Lanka where people should sing & dance in a unique manner illustrating Arichandra Puranam. This dancing event takes place in front of Chevvai Veedu for a week in the evenings during chevvai festival.
Thevar community will lead this. 

Virachilai thevar people are divided into 10 groups (vagai in Tamil) depending upon the location of their farms.

Each vagai or group will have its own God, but this amman is common for all the groups.

Each vagai or group has to select one girl (should be less than 12 yrs old) to represent them in this festival.

So, totally 11 girls, selected by all the groups will be handed over to Pandaram and will have to live in Chevvai Veedu, a significant festival house for 22 days along with Pandaram, who is in charge of festival house.

Pandaram is a person who directs this festival in front and his main duties are to look after chevvai veedu and these girls.

Goddess amman rides for NagarValam on a chariot every morning and evening for 9 days during this festival.

People must keep all the pooja items in a basket on their respective MANAIs', a special flat decorated stone installed in front of every house.

This festival ends on 22 nd day which is called uthiravai dudaippu.

Oyilattam Picture

Other Festivals 
 Sri valli deivanai samathe kalyana murugan r Kovil festival is celebrated by Nattukkottai chettiyars for every year April 14. Its grand festival.
 St. Joseph church festival has also celebrated in every year in middle month of July. To celebrate grandly managed by Christian community.
 ANI THIRUVIZHA is Sivan Kovil festival, celebrated in the Tamil month of Ani every year for 10 days.

The nearby villages, Neikkunam, Melavayal, Rendivayal, V. Laxmipuram, Idayankadu, Kanakkavayal, Maruthakudipatti are well associated with religious activities in past centuries.

Tourist Places 
Muppali Karuppar Kovil, 2 km away from Virachilai is located in Rendivayal, which is Gula Theivam for people belonging to thevar people's vagai I.

Malaya Kovil, 5 km away from Virachilai, is very popular for Thaipoosam festival every year.

Tirumayam Fort, 8 km away from virachilai is one of the historical places where famous freedom fighters Veerapandiya Kattabomman and his brother Umathaiturai hid after their fight against the British during 17th Century.

Thirumayam Perumal temple is one of the 108 thirupathi's defined by alwars/vaishnavites.

Devamalai, 6 km away from Virachilai is associated with one of the 63 Nayanmars called Perumizhalai Kurumbanayanar.

Thabasu Malai, 4 km away from Virachilai has a beautiful Subramaniar temple built on a hill. This temple is very popular for Panguni Uthiram festival every year.

Perunthurai, 5 km away from Virachilai is a village where Perumal, Siva, poovayi amman and ayyanar temples are located at the same place. A river called pambaaru is originating from Perunthurai.

Naganatha Swamy temple is located in Perayur which is 7 km virachilai. This temple is considered as powerful as Thirunageshwaram temple and Kalakshthi.

Konnayur Maariamman Kovil, 20 km away from Virachilai is a popular Mariamman Kovil in Pudukkottai district.

Bus route 
13 (via - Arangirampatti,V Lakshmipuram),13A(kamalam), kumaran - from Pudukkottai. 1, 5, (Via - Arangirampatti) From Thirumayam and Ponnamaravathi

Via air 

From Trichy Airport -> Pudukkottai -> Virachilai.

Education 

PR M Meyyappa Chettiar Middle School:
This is one of the popular management schools around Virachilai in terms of educational standard and quality. This school is more than 100 years old. The school is managed and administered by PR M Meyyappa Chettiar Family Trust. They well created lot of doctors and engineers in this school. Students are trained to be more intelligent and to develop good sportsmanship.

St. Joseph Matriculation School:
Matriculation school administered by Christian community.

 Villages in Pudukkottai district